Indy de Vroome was the defending champion, having won the event in 2013, however she chose to participate in Makinohara instead.

Mariana Duque won the title, defeating An-Sophie Mestach in the final, 3–6, 6–1, 7–6(7–4).

Seeds

Main draw

Finals

Top half

Bottom half

References 
 Main draw

Abierto Tampico - Singles